Asota tortuosa is a moth of the family Erebidae first described by Frederic Moore in 1872. It is found in China, India, Myanmar, Nepal, Sikkim and Taiwan.

The wingspan is 61–67 mm.

References

Asota (moth)
Moths of Asia
Moths described in 1872